Trifluoroacetic acid (TFA) is an organofluorine compound with the chemical formula CF3CO2H. It is a structural analogue of acetic acid with all three of the acetyl group's hydrogen atoms replaced by fluorine atoms and is a colorless liquid with a vinegar-like odor.  TFA is a stronger acid than acetic acid, having an acid ionisation constant, Ka, that is approximately 34,000 times higher, as the highly electronegative fluorine atoms and consequent electron-withdrawing nature of the trifluoromethyl group weakens the oxygen-hydrogen bond (allowing for greater acidity) and stabilises the anionic conjugate base.  TFA is widely used in organic chemistry for various purposes.

Synthesis
TFA is prepared industrially by the electrofluorination of acetyl chloride or acetic anhydride, followed by hydrolysis of the resulting trifluoroacetyl fluoride:

 + 4  →  + 3  + 
 +  →  + 

Where desired, this compound may be dried by addition of trifluoroacetic anhydride.

An older route to TFA proceeds via the oxidation of 1,1,1-trifluoro-2,3,3-trichloropropene with potassium permanganate. The trifluorotrichloropropene can be prepared by Swarts fluorination of hexachloropropene.

Uses
TFA is the precursor to many other fluorinated compounds such as trifluoroacetic anhydride, trifluoroperacetic acid, and 2,2,2-trifluoroethanol. It is a reagent used in organic synthesis because of a combination of convenient properties: volatility, solubility in organic solvents, and its strength as an acid. TFA is also less oxidizing than sulfuric acid but more readily available in anhydrous form than many other acids.  One complication to its use is that TFA forms an azeotrope with water (b. p. 105 °C).

TFA is popularly used as a strong acid to remove t-butyl derived side-chain protecting groups in Fmoc peptide synthesis, and in other organic syntheses to remove the t-butoxycarbonyl protecting group.

At a low concentration, TFA is used as an ion pairing agent in liquid chromatography (HPLC) of organic compounds, particularly peptides and small proteins. TFA is a versatile solvent for NMR spectroscopy (for materials stable in acid). It is also used as a calibrant in mass spectrometry.

TFA is used to produce trifluoroacetate salts.

Safety
Trifluoroacetic acid is a corrosive acid but it does not pose the hazards associated with hydrofluoric acid because the carbon-fluorine bond is not labile. Only if heated or treated with ultrasonic waves will it decompose into hydrofluoric acid. TFA is harmful when inhaled, causes severe skin burns and is toxic for aquatic organisms even at low concentrations.

TFA's reaction with bases and metals, especially light metals, is strongly exothermic. The reaction with lithium aluminium hydride (LAH) results in an explosion.

TFA is a metabolic breakdown product of the volatile anaesthetic agent halothane. It is thought to be responsible for halothane induced hepatitis.

Environment

TFA was claimed to occur naturally in sea water, but only in small concentrations at about 200 ng per liter. However, a review paper from 2021 concludes that there is insufficient evidence that TFA occurs naturally, especially without a reasonable mechanism of formation.

In the environment, it is also formed, among other things, by photooxidation of the commonly used refrigerant 1,1,1,2-tetrafluoroethane (R-134a). Moreover, it is formed as an atmospheric degradation product of almost all fourth-generation synthetic refrigerants, also called hydrofluoroolefins (HFO), such as 2,3,3,3-tetrafluoropropene. 

TFA is virtually non-degradable (persistent) in the environment. Median concentrations of a few micrograms per liter have been found in beer and tea. TFA is toxic to aquatic lifealthough it does not bioaccumulate, prevention of release into waterways is of extreme importance when using TFA.

See also
 Fluoroacetic acidhighly toxic but naturally occurring rodenticide CH2FCOOH
 Difluoroacetic acid
 Trichloroacetic acid, the chlorinated analog

References

Perfluorocarboxylic acids

Reagents for organic chemistry
Organic compounds with 2 carbon atoms